Nilo Soares (born July 18, 1994) is an East Timorese footballer who plays as midfielder for Karketu Dili and the Timor-Leste national team.

References

1994 births
Association football midfielders
East Timorese footballers
Timor-Leste international footballers
A.D. Dili Leste players
Living people
People from Dili
Footballers at the 2014 Asian Games
East Timorese expatriate footballers
Expatriate footballers in South Korea
Asian Games competitors for East Timor